Carl James Madrick (born 20 September 1968) is a former professional footballer, who played for Huddersfield Town, Peterborough United and Chorley.

References

1968 births
Living people
English footballers
Footballers from Bolton
Association football midfielders
English Football League players
Huddersfield Town A.F.C. players
Peterborough United F.C. players
Chorley F.C. players